The sub-group hiding assumption is a computational hardness assumption used in elliptic curve cryptography and pairing-based cryptography.

It was first introduced in to build a 2-DNF homomorphic encryption scheme.

See also
 Non-interactive zero-knowledge proof

References

Computational hardness assumptions
Elliptic curve cryptography
Pairing-based cryptography